Gyertyános is the Hungarian name for two villages in Romania:

 Carpenii de Sus village, Șpring Commune, Alba County
 Cărpiniş village, Simeria Town, Hunedoara County